Katumsky sheep are a Russian sheep breed.

History 
Katumsky sheep were developed around 2013 at Katumy Farm near Vsevolozhsky district of Leningrad oblast, Russia by Oleg Lebed, primarily for meat production. Due to its ability to adapt to a variety of regions within Russia, the Katumsky sheep breed has the potential to become the basis of a commercially and economically engaging herd due to their ability immunological reactivity, high fertility, maternal qualities and low maintenance costs.

Characteristics 
Katumsky are easy to care for. They are calm, plain bodied sheep that produce little wool. They are of medium height with a strong skeleton, well-developed muscles, wide and deep chests, a middle tail and hornless head. 
At maturity on average, rams weigh 110 kg (242 lb) and ewes, on average, weigh 80 kg (176 lb) under good conditions. High lambing percentages are common (up to 220 per 100 ewes).

The breed is quite common in the north-west areas of Russia.

References

External links
 Russian Ministry of Agriculture registered a new breed of sheep developed in Leningrad oblast (in Russian language)
Recipients of Stolypin "Russian Agrarian Elite 2018" Award (in Russian language)
Meet breed selection of Leningrad sheep received "Gold" (in Russian language) 
В Госреестре появились новые породы сельскохозяйственных животных
Leningrad farmer - gold again (in Russian language) 
Ленинградские овцы мясной породы – среди лучших в России 
Meet breed of sheep - Katumskaya (in Russian language) 
New breed of sheep developed in Lenoblast in 300 years (in Russian language)

Sheep breeds originating in Russia
Sheep breeds